Raghu Manivannan is an Indian actor, who has appeared in Tamil language films. The son of actor Manivannan, he has appeared in films including Maaran (2002) and Nagaraja Cholan MA, MLA (2013).

Career
Raghu Manivannan made his debut with the Sathyaraj-starrer Maaran (2002), with a critic from The Hindu stating "as the studious first year medical college student suits the character so well, that you forget that the lad is just acting out a role". He subsequently failed to get bigger film offers and worked on a couple of low-budget ventures and shelved films including Kadhal Valarthen, where he worked with Manoj Bharathiraja and Kunal. In 2013, Raghu Manivannan played a leading role alongside Sathyaraj in his father's 50th directorial venture, Nagaraja Cholan MA, MLA. He had also signed up to act in his father's next project Thalattu Machi Thalattu, but the film was cancelled after Manivannan died in June 2013.

In February 2015, Raghu Manivannan announced that he was working towards directing a remake of his father's Nooravathu Naal (1984). He began scripting the film to adapt it to modern day audiences, while signing on Natarajan Subramaniam to portray the lead role.

Personal life
Raghu Manivannan married Abigail Manuelraj who is from London on 16 September 2013. They have two children called Aadhvik Benjamin who was born on 14 November 2016 and Aadhityan Bennaiah who was born on 13 May 2018.

Filmography

References

Living people
Male actors in Tamil cinema
21st-century Indian male actors
1984 births